Kudhës is a village on the Albanian Riviera, Vlorë County, Albania. It is part of the municipality Himarë.

Demographics 
The village of Kudhës is inhabited by an Orthodox Albanian population.

Notable people
Sotiris Ninis, footballer born in Kudhës

References

Populated places in Himara
Villages in Vlorë County
Albanian Ionian Sea Coast
Labëria